Todd Atkinson is a Canadian Anglican bishop. He is a bishop at the Anglican Church in North America (ACNA) and was the first bishop of Via Apostolica. He was consecrated a bishop on the Eve of the Ascension 2012 while leading Via Apostolica as an independent church movement. Atkinson was later admitted into ACNA's College of Bishops on January 10, 2019 then the next year, on June 24, 2020, Via Apostolica was accepted as a missionary district in ACNA.

Education and career
Atkinson grew up in the Canadian Prairies and became a Christian in his teen years. At the age of 18 Atkinson moved to the United Kingdom to train with an evangelist. At the age of 25 Atkinson began attending the University of Oxford studying theology and philosophy. After his studies he returned to Canada and served as president of a small theological college. After some time he returned to the United Kingdom with his wife to serve as missionaries in Scotland. Atkinson returned in 2003 and began pastoral ministry in Lethbridge, Alberta. This church would eventually be the origins of Via Apostolica, which would formally begin with his consecration as a bishop in 2012.

The ACNA official website reported on 5 September 2021 that bishop Todd Atkinson, amidst allegations of misconduct, was taking a leave of absence. On 16 October 2021, it was announced that during this time, ACNA had appointed as Interim Bishop of Via Apostolica, Quigg Lawrence. On 6 November 2021, ACNA reported that the provincial investigation had begun.

References

Canadian bishops of the Anglican Church in North America
Alumni of the University of Oxford
Living people
Year of birth missing (living people)